Granville Bridge may refer to:

 Granville Bridge, Maryborough, a bridge in Maryborough, Queensland, Australia
 Granville Street Bridge, a bridge in Vancouver, British Columbia

See also
Granville